A GeneralizedTime is a time format in the ASN.1 notation.
It consists of a string value representing the calendar date, as defined in ISO 8601, a time of day with an optional fractional seconds element and the optional local time differential factor as defined in ISO 8601. 

In contrast to the UTCe class of ASN.1 the  uses a four-digit representation of the year to avoid possible ambiguity.
Another difference is the possibility to encode time information of any wanted precision via the fractional seconds element.

Examples from ITU-T X.680:
"19851106210627.3"
local time 6 minutes, 27.3 seconds after 9 pm on 6 November 1985.

"19851106210627.3Z"
coordinated universal time as above.

"19851106210627.3-0500"
local time as in the first example, with local time 5 hours retarded in relation to coordinated universal time.

ASN.1 also defines a  time format widely used in SNMP, that includes separator characters and does not pad the fields (e.g., "1985-11-6,21:6:27.3,-5:0").

See also 
 The X.690 encoding standard for ASN.1

ITU-T recommendations
ITU-T G Series Recommendations